Kadapa Assembly constituency is a constituency of the Andhra Pradesh Legislative Assembly, India. It is one of 7 constituencies in the YSR Kadapa district.

Amzath Basha Shaik Bepari of Yuvajana Sramika Rythu Congress Party  is currently representing the constituency.

Constituencies in Kadapa District 

The total geographical area of the district is 15,379 sq. km. with    3 Revenue divisions and 51 Mandals, 2 Parliamentary Constituencies and 10 Assembly Constituencies.

Overview
It is part of the Kadapa Lok Sabha constituency along with another six Vidhan Sabha segments, namely, Badvel, Pulivendla, Kamalapuram, Jammalamadugu, Proddatur and Mydukur in YSR Kadapa district.

Mandals

Members of Legislative Assembly

Election results

Assembly elections 1952

Assembly Elections 2004

Assembly Elections 2009

Assembly elections 2014

Assembly elections 2019

See also
 List of constituencies of Andhra Pradesh Legislative Assembly

References

Assembly constituencies of Andhra Pradesh
Kadapa